Archips taichunganus is a moth of the family Tortricidae. It is found in Taiwan.

The wingspan is 29 mm.

References

Moths described in 2000
Archips
Moths of Taiwan
Taxa named by Józef Razowski